Balli Singh Cheema (born 2 September 1952) is a famous Hindi poet and currently politician of Aam Aadmi Party, contesting 2014 Indian general election from Nainital Constituency.

Award
 Cheema has received Ganga Sharan Singh Award from president Pratibha Patil.
 Shiromani Hindi Sahitkar from Government of Punjab, India

References

Living people
Politicians from Amritsar
Hindi-language poets
Aam Aadmi Party candidates in the 2014 Indian general election
1952 births
Aam Aadmi Party politicians from Punjab, India
21st-century Indian politicians
Punjab, India politicians